Eunice Mary Kennedy Shriver  (July 10, 1921 – August 11, 2009) was an American philanthropist and a member of the Kennedy family. She was the founder of the Special Olympics, a sports organization for persons with physical and intellectual disabilities. For her efforts on behalf of disabled people, Shriver was awarded the Presidential Medal of Freedom in 1984.

She was a sister of U.S. President John F. Kennedy, U.S. Senators Robert F. Kennedy and Edward Kennedy, Rosemary Kennedy, and U.S. Ambassador to Ireland Jean Kennedy Smith, sister-in-law of Jacqueline Kennedy as well as the mother-in-law of Arnold Schwarzenegger. She was married to Sargent Shriver, who was the United States Ambassador to France and was the Democratic nominee for Vice President of the United States in 1972.

Early life, education, and early career
Eunice Mary Kennedy was born in Brookline, Massachusetts, on July 10, 1921. She was the fifth of nine children of Joseph P. Kennedy, Sr., and Rose Fitzgerald. Her siblings included U.S. President John F. Kennedy, U.S. Attorney General and U.S. Senator Robert F. Kennedy, U.S. Senator Edward Kennedy, and U.S. Ambassador to Ireland Jean Kennedy Smith.

Shriver was educated at the Convent of The Sacred Heart, Roehampton (in London), and Manhattanville College. After graduating from Stanford University in 1943 with a Bachelor of Science degree in sociology, she worked for the Special War Problems Division of the U.S. State Department. She eventually moved to the U.S. Justice Department as executive secretary for a project dealing with juvenile delinquency. She served as a social worker at the Federal Industrial Institution for Women for one year before moving to Chicago in 1951 to work with the House of the Good Shepherd women's shelter and Chicago Juvenile Court.

Charity work and awards

Shriver became executive vice president of the Joseph P. Kennedy Jr. Foundation in 1957. She shifted the organization's focus from Catholic charities to research on the causes of intellectual disabilities, and humane ways to treat them. This interest eventually culminated in, among other things, the Special Olympics movement.

A long-time advocate for children's health and disability issues, Shriver championed the creation of the President's Panel on Mental Retardation in 1961. The panel was significant in the movement from institutionalization to community integration in the US and throughout the world. Shriver was a key founder of the National Institute of Child Health and Human Development (NICHD), a part of the National Institutes of Health in 1962. She has also helped to establish numerous other university programs, government initiatives, health-care facilities, and support service networks throughout the country.

In 1962, Shriver founded Camp Shriver, a camp for children with special needs that was held on her Maryland farm. Camp Shriver later evolved into the Special Olympics. Shriver founded the Special Olympics in 1968. That year, the Joseph P. Kennedy Jr. Foundation helped to plan and fund the First International Special Olympics Summer Games, held in Chicago, Illinois. In her speech at the opening ceremony, Shriver said, "'The Chicago Special Olympics prove a very fundamental fact, the fact that exceptional children — children with mental retardation — can be exceptional athletes, the fact that through sports they can realize their potential for growth.'" Special Olympics Inc. was established as a nonprofit charity in 1968; since that time, nearly three million athletes have participated.

In 1969, Shriver moved to France and pursued her interest in intellectual disability there. She started organizing small activities with Paris organizations, mostly reaching out to families of kids who had special needs to provide activities for them, laying the foundation for a robust international expansion of the Special Olympics in the late 1970s and 1980s.

In 1982, Shriver founded the Eunice Kennedy Shriver National Center for Community of Caring at University of Utah, Salt Lake City. The Community is a "grades K-12, whole school, comprehensive character education program with a focus on disabilities... adopted by almost 1,200 schools nationwide and in Canada".

Shriver was awarded the nation's highest civilian award, the Presidential Medal of Freedom, in 1984 by U.S. President Ronald Reagan for her work on behalf of persons with disabilities. In 1988, she received the Laetare Medal, considered the highest award for American Catholics, by the University of Notre Dame. In 1990 Shriver was awarded the Eagle Award from the United States Sports Academy. The Eagle Award is the academy's highest international honor and was awarded to Shriver for her significant contributions to international sport.

In 1992, Shriver received the Senator John Heinz Award for Greatest Public Service Benefiting the Disadvantaged, an award given out annually by Jefferson Awards.

For her work in nationalizing the Special Olympics, Shriver received the Civitan International World Citizenship Award. Her advocacy on this issue has also earned her other awards and recognitions, including honorary degrees from numerous universities. She is the second American and only woman to appear on a US coin while still living. Her portrait is on the obverse of the 1995 commemorative silver dollar honoring the Special Olympics. On the reverse is the quotation attributed to Shriver, "As we hope for the best in them, hope is reborn in us."

In 1998, Shriver was inducted into the National Women's Hall of Fame.

Shriver received the 2002 Theodore Roosevelt Award (the Teddy), an annual award given by the National Collegiate Athletic Association to a graduate from an NCAA member institution who earned a varsity letter in college for participation in intercollegiate athletics, and who ultimately became a distinguished citizen of national reputation based on outstanding life accomplishment.  In addition to the Teddy recognition, she was selected in 2006 as part of the NCAA Centennial celebration as one of the 100 most-influential individuals in its first century; she was listed ninth. In 2006, she received a papal knighthood from Pope Benedict XVI, being made a Dame of the Order of St. Gregory the Great (DSG). Her mother had been created a papal countess in 1950 by Pope Pius XII.

In 2008, she received the Foremother Award from the National Center for Health Research for her lifetime achievements.

In 2008, the U.S. Congress changed the NICHD's name to the Eunice Kennedy Shriver National Institute of Child Health and Human Development. In December 2008, Sports Illustrated named Shriver the first recipient of Sportsman of the Year Legacy Award. On May 9, 2009, the Smithsonian Institution's National Portrait Gallery (NPG) in Washington, D.C., unveiled an historic portrait of her, the first portrait the NPG has ever commissioned of an individual who had not served as a U.S. president or First Lady. The portrait depicts her with four Special Olympics athletes (including Loretta Claiborne) and one Best Buddies participant. It was painted by David Lenz, the winner of the Outwin Boochever Portrait Competition in 2006. As part of the Portrait Competition prize, the NPG commissioned a work from the winning artist to depict a living subject for the collection. Lenz, whose son, Sam, has Down syndrome and is an enthusiastic Special Olympics athlete, was inspired by Shriver's dedication to working with people with intellectual disabilities.

Shriver became involved with Dorothy Hamill's special skating program in the Special Olympics after Hamill's Olympic Games ice-skating win. In September 2010, the State University of New York at Brockport, home of the 1979 Special Olympics, renamed its football stadium the Eunice Kennedy Shriver Stadium.

In July 2017, Shriver posthumously received the Arthur Ashe Courage Award at the 2017 ESPY Awards.

Political involvement
Shriver actively campaigned for her elder brother, John, during his successful 1960 U.S. presidential election.

Although Shriver was a Democrat, she was a vocal supporter of the anti-abortion movement. In 1990, Shriver wrote a letter to The New York Times denouncing an abortion rights group for having used a quotation of President Kennedy's words out of context in support of their position. Shriver was one of several prominent Democrats – including Governor Robert P. Casey of Pennsylvania and Bishop Austin Vaughan of New York – who took out a full-page The New York Times advertisement opposing "abortion on demand" during the 1992 Democratic Convention (the Party adopted a 1992 platform that emphasized its support for abortion rights). Shriver was a supporter of several anti-abortion organizations: Feminists for Life of America, the Susan B. Anthony List, and Democrats for Life of America.

Despite being a Democrat, Shriver supported her Republican son-in-law Arnold Schwarzenegger's successful 2003 Governor of California election.

On January 28, 2008, aged 86, Shriver was present at American University in Washington, D.C., when her brother, U.S. Senator Edward M. Kennedy, announced his endorsement of Barack Obama's 2008 Democratic U.S. presidential campaign.

Personal life

On May 23, 1953, aged 31, Shriver married Sargent Shriver in a Roman Catholic ceremony at Saint Patrick's Cathedral in New York City. Her husband served as the U.S. Ambassador to France from 1968 to 1970 and was the 1972 Democratic U.S. vice presidential candidate (with George McGovern as the candidate for U.S. President). They had five children: Robert Sargent Shriver III, Maria Owings Shriver, Timothy Perry Shriver, Mark Kennedy Shriver, and Anthony Paul Kennedy Shriver. Shriver had nineteen grandchildren.

Shriver had a close relationship with her sister Rosemary Kennedy, who was intellectually disabled and who became incapacitated due to a lobotomy.

Shriver suffered a stroke and broken hip in 2005. On November 18, 2007, aged 86, she was admitted to Massachusetts General Hospital in Boston, where she spent several weeks.

Death
On August 7, 2009, Shriver was admitted to Cape Cod Hospital in Hyannis, Massachusetts with an undisclosed ailment. On August 10, her relatives were called to the hospital. She died at the hospital the next day at the age of 88. She died 2 weeks before her brother Senator Edward Moore Kennedy died on August 25, 2009 at the age of 77.

Shriver's family issued a statement upon her death, reading in part:

President Barack Obama remarked after Shriver's death that she was "an extraordinary woman who, as much as anyone, taught our nation—and our world—that no physical or mental barrier can restrain the power of the human spirit."

Funeral and burial
On August 14, 2009, an invitation-only Requiem Mass was celebrated for Shriver at St. Francis Xavier Roman Catholic Church in Hyannis.  Following the Requiem Mass, she was buried at the St. Francis Xavier parish cemetery in nearby Centerville. Pope Benedict XVI sent a letter of condolence to her family. Because her brother Ted had terminal brain cancer, he was unable to attend the funeral, and their sister Jean Kennedy Smith stayed with him. Ted died two weeks later, leaving Jean as the sole surviving child of Joseph and Rose Kennedy until her death on June 17, 2020 at the age of 92.

See also

 Kennedy family
 Kennedy family tree
 National Institute of Child Health and Human Development
 Special Olympics

References

Further reading

External links

Official website
 Shriver, Maria (August 14, 2009).  Transcript. "Maria Shriver's Eulogy of Her Mother", The Boston Globe.  Accessed August 31, 2009.
 "Statement from the President on the Passing Of Eunice Kennedy Shriver", (August 11, 2009) on the White House's website
 "Special Olympians, Family Celebrate Eunice Kennedy Shriver", article on funeral and burial by The Associated Press (at WJAR television's website turnto10.com)
 
 communityofcaring.org, Eunice Kennedy Shriver National Center for Community of Caring's official website
 Shapiro, Joseph, Eunice Kennedy Shriver's Olympic Legacy, (April 5, 2007) Morning Edition on National Public Radio's website (includes podcast as well as text)
 Coin of the Month , U.S. Mint "Coin of the Month" page (geared for children) on the 1995 Special Olympics Commemorative Silver Dollar

1921 births
2009 deaths
American anti-abortion activists
American nonprofit executives
American people of Irish descent
American sociologists
Catholics from Massachusetts
Convent of the Sacred Heart (NYC) alumni
Dames of St. Gregory the Great
American disability rights activists
Kennedy family
Laetare Medal recipients
Laureus World Sports Awards winners
Manhattanville College alumni
Massachusetts Democrats
People from Barnstable, Massachusetts
People from Brookline, Massachusetts
People from Purchase, New York
Presidential Medal of Freedom recipients
Recipients of the Four Freedoms Award
Schools of the Sacred Heart alumni
Shriver family
Special Olympics
Stanford Cardinal women's swimmers
Stanford Cardinal women's track and field athletes